HC Tambov is an ice hockey team in Tambov, Russia. They were founded in 1981, and play in the Supreme Hockey League, the second level of ice hockey in Russia.

External links
 Official site

Ice hockey teams in Russia